Mals is a comune (municipality) in South Tyrol in northern Italy, located about  northwest of Bolzano, on the border with Switzerland and Austria.

History

Coat-of-arms
The emblem is party per fess: the upper of gules a fess argent, at the bottom or three gules circles arranged in a triangle upside-down. It is the combination of coats of arms of the House of Austria and Medici. The emblem was adopted in 1928.

Geography
The Zerzer Tal, a side valley of the Vinschgau, is in Mals.

Mals borders the following municipalities: Graun im Vinschgau, Glurns, Laas, Scuol (Switzerland), Schnals, Sent (Switzerland), Schlanders, Schluderns, Sölden (Austria), and Taufers im Münstertal.

Frazioni
The municipality of Mals contains the frazioni (subdivisions, mainly villages and hamlets): Burgeis (Burgusio), Laatsch (Laudes), Matsch (Mazia), Planeil (Planol), Plawenn (Piavenna), Schleis (Clusio),  (Slingia), Tartsch (Tarces), and Ulten-Alsack (Alsago-Ultimo).

Climate and Temperature

Mals has a cool, wet climate. Frost is common from October to May and is even recorded in the summer, although temperatures below -1C are rare from June to September. Most winter days fail to rise above freezing. Summer is generally mild, but most summers see temperatures rise above 20C on several days.

Transportation
The commune is the northern terminus of the train from Meran. The trip from Merano takes approximately 1 hour 15 minutes. Trains depart hourly. There is also local bus service between Mals and Schlanders.

Notable people 
 Johann Rufinatscha (1812–1893), an Austrian composer, theorist and music teacher
 Walter Caldonazzi (1916-1945), an important resistance fighter against Nazi Germany
 Karl Plattner (1919–1986), painter.
 Gabriel Grüner (1963-1999), journalist for Stern magazine, shot by Yugoslav soldiers

Society

Linguistic distribution
According to the 2011 census, 96.92% of the population speak German, 3.00% Italian and 0.08% Ladin as first language.

Demographic evolution

Gallery

References

External links

Municipality of Mals Homepage (in German and Italian)
General information about Mals, Tourism and Shopping (English)

Municipalities of South Tyrol